The Colchester and Hants Regiment was an infantry regiment of the Non-Permanent Active Militia of the Canadian Militia (now the Canadian Army). In 1936, it was amalgamated with The Cumberland Highlanders to create The North Nova Scotia Highlanders.

Lineage

The Colchester and Hants Regiment 

 Originated on 1 April 1910, in Truro, Nova Scotia as the 70th Colchester and Hants Regiment .
 Redesignated on 2 May 1910, as the 76th Colchester and Hants Rifles.
 Amalgamated on 1 April 1920, with the 81st Hants Regiment and redesignated as The Colchester and Hants Regiment.
 Amalgamated on 1 December 1936, with The Cumberland Highlanders and “C” Company of the 6th Machine Gun Battalion, CMGC to form The North Nova Scotia Highlanders (Machine Gun).

81st Hants Regiment 

 Originated on 16 February 1914, in Windsor, Nova Scotia, as a Regiment of Infantry in Hants County.
 Redesignated on 1 May 1914, as the 68th Regiment.
Redesignated again on 1 June 1914, as the 81st Hants Regiment.
 Amalgamated on 15 May 1920, with the 76th Colchester and Hants Rifles and Redesignated as The Colchester and Hants Regiment.

Perpetuations 

25th Battalion (Nova Scotia Rifles), CEF
 106th Battalion (Nova Scotia Rifles), CEF

History

First World War 
On 6 August 1914, detachments of the 76th Colchester and Hants Rifles were placed on active service for local protection duties.

On 7 November 1914, the 25th Battalion (Nova Scotia Rifles), CEF was authorized and on 20 May 1915, the battalion embarked for Great Britain. On 16 September 1916, the 25th Battalion disembarked in France where it fought as part of the 5th Canadian Infantry Brigade, 2nd Canadian Division in France and Flanders until the end of the war. On 15 September 1920, the 25th Battalion, CEF was disbanded upon its return to Canada.

On 22 December 1915, the 106th Battalion (Nova Scotia Rifles), CEF was authorized and on 15 July 1916, the battalion embarked for Great Britain. After it's arrival in the UK, the 25th Battalion provided reinforcements for the Canadian Corps in the field. On 5 October 1916, its personnel were absorbed by the 40th Battalion (Nova Scotia), CEF. Finally on 8 December 1917, the 106th Battalion, CEF was disbanded.

1920s–1930s 
On 1 April 1920, as a result of the Otter Commission, the 76th Colchester and Hants Rifles were Amalgamated with the 81st Hants Regiment and became The Colchester and Hants Regiment.

On 1 December 1936, as a result of the 1936 Canadian Militia reorganization, The Colchester and Hants Regiment were amalgamated with The Cumberland Highlanders and “C” Company of the 6th Machine Gun Battalion, CMGC to form The North Nova Scotia Highlanders (Machine Gun).

Alliances 

  - The South Staffordshire Regiment (Until 1936)

Battle honours

Great War 
 Mount Sorrel
 Somme, 1916, '18
 Flers-Courcelette
 Thiepval
 Ancre Heights
 Arras, 1917, '18
 Vimy, 1917
 Arleux
 Scarpe, 1917, '18
 Hill 70
 Ypres, 1917
 Passchendaele
 Amiens
 Hindenburg Line
 Canal du Nord
 Cambrai, 1918
 Pursuit to Mons
 France and Flanders, 1915–18

Notes and references

Infantry regiments of Canada
Military regiments raised in Nova Scotia
Military units and formations disestablished in 1936
1936 disestablishments in Canada